Paopi 16 - Coptic Calendar - Paopi 18

The seventeenth day of the Coptic month of Paopi, the second month of the Coptic year. On a common year, this day corresponds to October 14, of the Julian Calendar, and October 27, of the Gregorian Calendar. This day falls in the Coptic season of Peret, the season of emergence.

Commemorations

Saints 

 The departure of Pope Dioscorus II, the thirty-first Patriarch of the See of Saint Mark

References 

Days of the Coptic calendar